DELNI may refer to:

 Department for Employment and Learning of Northern Ireland, a defunct government department in Northern Ireland
 Digital Ethernet Local Network Interconnect, an Ethernet communications product manufactured in the 1980s.